Oksana Liaturynska (born 1 February 1902, in Katerynivka, died 13 June 1970, in Minneapolis) was a Ukrainian artist, sculptor, writer, poet and public figure. Liaturynska signed her works either by her own name or by pen names: Oksana Pechenih, Roksana Vyshnevetska and Yeronim.

Biography
Oksana Liaturynska was born on 1 February 1902 in the hamlet of Lisky in the Volyn province of the Russian Empire (now the Ternopil region of Ukraine). Her father, Mykhailo Liaturynsky, served as an officer at the Russian border post near . Liaturynska’s mother, Anna, came from a family of German colonists. She had six sisters and brothers: Oleksandr, Antonina, Gnat, Ivan, Maria, and Fedir.

From the early 1920s, Liaturynska studied at the Ivan Steshenko Kremenets Private Ukrainian Grammar School. When she was 20, her father decided to arrange for her to marry a rich peasant but she didn’t accept it and ran away from home to relatives who lived in the nearby village of Katerynivka. She emigrated at the age of 22 with the help of her relatives first to Germany, then to Czechoslovakia, and finally to the United States. 
She began her literary career in Prague and was a member of a “Prague school” grouped émigré writers. She was actively involved in the social and cultural life of Ukrainian emigrants.

She studies at the Faculty of Philosophy of Charles University, at the Ukrainian Studio of Plastic Art, at the Czech High School of Art and Industry, where she regularly attended sculpture classes with Czech professors Blažek and Waxman, and which she graduated in 1934.

In 1945, she found herself in a camp for displaced persons in Aschaffenburg, Germany, then in 1949 in exile in the United States. With the help of the Ukrainian Women's Union she settled in Minneapolis.

Liaturynska died of cancer in Minneapolis in 1970. An urn with her ashes is buried in the Ukrainian Orthodox Cemetery in Bound Brook, New Jersey.

Works
Liaturynska repeatedly turned to folk art in her work.

She took part in a number of exhibitions in London, Paris, and Berlin and gained recognition as a master of sculptural portraits. She created the monument to the fallen soldiers of the Ukrainian People's Republic in Pardubice (1932) and the busts of Taras Shevchenko, Tomáš Masaryk, Symon Petliura and Yevhen Konovalets. Several gravestones made by Liaturynska can be seen in Prague cemeteries.

She painted portraits with pencil and charcoal, rarely with a pen and hardly ever used paint. She also worked in ceramics, made colourful and original dolls and Easter eggs.

Liaturynska also wrote poetry, starting as a teenager in 1917. She began to publish them in 1931 and her poems were published in many periodicals, making her very popular. In 1938, a series of her poems were collected in a book called Husla (a multi-string musical instrument) and in 1941 a second book, Kniazha emal’ (Princely Enamel), was published. In 1956, these two collections and the book Veselka (Rainbow) were published together in one volume. In 1946, she published Materynky (Wild Thyme), a book of autobiographical children's stories. In 1956, Bedryk (An Epiphany Carol) was a collection of poems for children. The latter two books were illustrated by the author. Liaturynska also participated in the activities of the Association of Ukrainian Writers “Word” (“Slovo”).

The book Iahilka (A Spring Song, 1971) was published posthumously.

Commemoration 
A monument to Liaturynska was unveiled in 2002 in Khoma hamlet in honor of the 100th anniversary of her birth funded by the writer Gavril Chernykhivsky, the family, the Zbarazh district community, and the Ternopil Writers' Union.

Notes

References

1902 births
1970 deaths
Soviet emigrants to the United States
20th-century Ukrainian artists
20th-century Ukrainian sculptors
20th-century Ukrainian women writers
20th-century Ukrainian poets